Pyrrolidone may refer to:

 2-Pyrrolidone
 3-Pyrrolidone